The EuroBasket 2009 Final was the championship game of the EuroBasket 2009 tournament. The game was played on 20 September 2009 at the Spodek in Katowice, Poland.

Spain won their first European title by defeating Serbia 85–63.

Final

The final was a rematch of each team's opening game, with the Spaniards attempting to avenge their 66–57 upset loss to the Serbians. Spain raced to a double-digit lead early in the first quarter, en route to an unassailable 52–29 lead at halftime. Serbia didn't catch up to hand Spain their first European Championship. Pau Gasol had a double-double with 18 points and 11 rebounds. Teammate Rudy Fernandez added 13 points and five rebounds. Uroš Tripković and Novica Veličković had 15 points each in a losing effort for the Serbs.

References

FIBA EuroBasket 2009
EuroBasket 2009 Final
2009 Final
2009 Final
2009–10 in Spanish basketball
2009–10 in Serbian basketball
2009
September 2009 sports events in Europe